Josephat Muraya is a Kenyan Olympic middle-distance runner. He represented his country in the men's 1500 meters at the 1984 Summer Olympics. His time was a 3:51.61 in the first heat.

References 

1957 births
Living people
Kenyan male middle-distance runners
Olympic athletes of Kenya
Athletes (track and field) at the 1984 Summer Olympics
20th-century Kenyan people